"O Youth and Beauty!" is a short story by John Cheever first published in The New Yorker on August 22, 1953. The work was included the collection of Cheever's short fiction The Housebreaker of Shady Hill and Other Stories (1958) by Harper and Brothers. The story is also included in The Stories of John Cheever (1978).

"O Youth and Beauty" is first of a series stories that Cheever set in the fictional town of Shady Hill, dealing with the New England suburban middle-class Often anthologized, the story concerns the physical and moral decline of a former male athlete, and his failure to cope with the onset of old age.

Plot
Cash Bentley is a 40-year-old businessman who resides with his wife Louise and two young children in Shady Hill, a New England suburb. Louise is preoccupied with her duties as a homemaker, which she manages with the couples' modest financial resources.  The social lives of Cash and Louise are limited to the endless local gatherings that occur at the homes of their neighbors. These get-togethers are fueled largely by alcohol.

Cash, a college track star in his youth, performs a ritual demonstration at these social events to prove his athletic prowess: whenever he is teased for his evident aging, he arranges the living room furniture into a mock hurdle course, then dashes over them at great speed to astonishment and delight of his guests.
 
Cash's physical and mental state undergo a sudden and precipitous decline after he breaks a leg during one of these drunken performances. His relationship with Louise, already strained, is further tested. Cash is entirely unequipped to face the loss of his youthful good looks and vitality. His awareness that most of the young men and woman in the Shady Hill community enjoy unbounded health and optimism tortures him.

In a final attempt to reclaim the past glories of his youth, he arranges the furniture in his own home, and prepares to run the course. He hands Louise a pistol, and instructs her to fire a round to launch the event. She struggles with the gun's safety catch and the weapon discharges. Cash is shot and killed instantly as he leaps over a sofa.

Theme
The opening framing sentence of the work—"one of the longest Cheever ever wrote"—is a litany of empty amusements that occupy the suburban residents of Shady Hill. This is the social milieu in which Cash declines morally and physically, and which can offer no alternative to his pathetic search for his lost youth. Literary critic Patrick Meanor remarks on the closing scene in the story:

Meanor adds: "Cash Bentley never loses his lethal innocence because he never grows up and becomes an adult. Indeed, the imperative to grow up and become consciously aware that he no longer a boy is precisely what kills him."

Cheever describes Cash's utter failure to transition to physical and emotional maturity. The social structure of the suburban Shady Hill provides Cash no means to reckon with his deterioration. Literary critic Samuel Coale writes:

Literary critic Lynne Waldeland questions if Cash's final performance was suicidal: "The story ends with an ambiguous act; yet one cannot help but feel that, given the limitations of his outlook on life, Cash probably is better off dead." Biographer James E. O'Hara also notes that the story ends on an "equivocal note" with respect to the Louise's agency in the death of her spouse. O'Hara points to a scene that sheds light on this question: Louise, after witnessing Cash collapse after an impromptu hurdling exhibition at the country club, tenderly cradles his head in her arms - long dash"strikingly reminiscent of Michelangelo's Pietà" O'Hara writes:

Footnotes

Sources 
Bailey, Blake. 2009 (1). Notes on Text in John Cheever: Collected Stories and Other Writing. The Library of America. Pp.1025-1028 
Bailey, Blake. 2009 (2). Cheever: A Life. Alfred A. Knopf, New York. 770 pp. 
Coale, Samuel. 1977. John Cheever. Frederick Ungar Publishing Company, New York. 
Meanor, Patrick. 1995. John Cheever Revisited. Twayne Publishers, New York. 
O'Hara, James E. 1989. John Cheever: A Study of the Short Fiction. Twayne Publishers, Boston Massachusetts. Twayne Studies in Short Fiction no 9. *Waldeland, Lynne. 1979. John Cheever. Twayne Publishers, G. K. Hall & Company, Boston, Massachusetts. 

1953 short stories
Short stories by John Cheever
Works originally published in The New Yorker